The men's 50m breaststroke events at the 2020 World Para Swimming European Championships were held at the Penteada Olympic Pools Complex.

Medalists

Results

SB2
Final

SB3
Heat 1

Final

References

2020 World Para Swimming European Championships